Jonah Sarwieh (born 24 September 1975) is a Liberian footballer. He played in six matches for the Liberia national football team from 1994 to 2004. He was also named in Liberia's squad for the 1996 African Cup of Nations tournament.

References

1975 births
Living people
Liberian footballers
Liberia international footballers
1996 African Cup of Nations players
Association football midfielders
Sportspeople from Monrovia